Charles Andrew Dyce (1816–1853) was born in St Nicholas, Aberdeen, Scotland to parents William Dyce and Margaret Chalmers who were married on 8 Feb 1798. Charles is also the younger brother of William Dyce (1806–1864), a renowned Scottish artist and a Royal Academician.

He arrived in Singapore from India in 1842 and was a merchant. In his stay in Singapore, Charles took on positions as First Secretary of the Singapore Sporting Club, an amateur thespian and, in 1847, High Sheriff for the settlements of Singapore, Malacca and Penang. He also designed the steeple of the Cathedral of the Good Shepherd. He met and married Eliza Hyde in 1845 in Singapore and had a son. They left for Calcutta together with him.

Charles also produced many sepia and watercolor paintings of scenes and landscapes in the Southeast Asian region. These works of art now form The Charles Dyce Collection found in the South & Southeast Asian Gallery of the National University of Singapore (NUS) Museum.

Bibliography

Papers

in

Books

1853 deaths
1816 births
19th-century Singaporean painters